Caxias is a municipality in the state of Maranhão in the Northeast region of Brazil.

It is the fifth largest city in the state, with a population of 165,525 inhabitants and an area of about 5,170 km2.

Notable people
Gonçalves Dias, poet, ethnographer, lawyer and linguist.

See also
List of municipalities in Maranhão

References

Municipalities in Maranhão